Customs is the fourth studio album by American post-punk band Savage Republic, released in 1989 by Fundamental Records. It was reissued on Mobilization Records in 2002.

Track listing

Personnel 
Adapted from the Customs liner notes.

Savage Republic
 Philip Drucker (as Jackson Del Rey) – guitar, vocals, percussion, saz, keyboards
 Thom Furhmann – guitar, bass guitar, vocals
 Greg Grunke – bass guitar, vocals, recorder, cümbüş
 Brad Laner – drums, percussion, keyboards, vocals
 Bruce Licher – bass guitar, guitar, percussion

Production and additional personnel
 Jimmy Bitzenis – mixing (8)
 George Manios – production, mixing (1-4, 6, 7)
 Savage Republic – production, mixing

Release history

References

External links 
 

1989 albums
Savage Republic albums